John Taylor is a retired hurling and Gaelic football player from County Laois, in Ireland.

Taylor normally played at left half back in his preferred game hurling and won eight Laois Senior Hurling Championship medals with his club, Portlaoise.

He also won Laois Senior Football Championship medals with Portlaoise.

Since ending his playing career, Taylor has moved into team management with Trumera, Mountrath and Laois.

Notes

References
 A Hundred Years Of The GAA In Laois by Teddy Fennelly, 1984.
 Laois GAA Yearbook, 1999

John Taylor is manager of Colt GAA club for 2013, having led them to an Intermediate hurling title in 2009.

Year of birth missing (living people)
Living people
Portlaoise hurlers
Portlaoise Gaelic footballers